Agnes Christine Johnston was an American screenwriter who wrote for more than 80 films between 1915 and 1948.

Biography

Early life 
Johnston was born in Swissvale, Pennsylvania, to John Johnston and Isabel McElhany. She attended the Horace Mann School and later took a playwright class at Harvard. Her sister Isabel Johnston also became a screenwriter.

Career 
When Vitagraph gave her an assignment to write a scenario for a James Oliver Curwood novel God's Country and the Woman, she reportedly completed the scenario in 24 hours.

Johnston penned a number of Andy Hardy films starring Mickey Rooney—among them The Hardys Ride High, Andy Hardy's Double Life, and Andy Hardy's Blonde Trouble.

Her other films included the comedy Seventeen, the romantic comedy Janie and its sequel, Janie Gets Married, plus the 1946 adaptation of Black Beauty. She also wrote the musical comedy The Time, the Place and the Girl.

Personal life 
Johnson was married to fellow screenwriter Frank Mitchell Dazey; the couple had three children together. Agnes died in San Diego, California, in 1978.

Partial filmography

 An Amateur Orphan (1917)
 The Fires of Youth (1917)
 It Happened to Adele (1917)
 Her New York (1917)
 When Love Was Blind (1917)
 How Could You, Caroline? (1918)
 The Great Adventure (1918)
 Daddy-Long-Legs (1919)
 Alarm Clock Andy (1920)
 Her Husband's Friend (1920)
 Home Stuff (1921)
 Rich Men's Wives (1922)
 Children of Dust (1923)
 Poor Men's Wives (1923)
 Mothers-in-Law (1923)
 The Female (1924)
 Forbidden Paradise (1924)
 For Another Woman (1924)
 Proud Flesh (1925)
 Don't (1925)
 The Denial (1925)
 Lovey Mary (1926)
 The Enemy (1927)
 The Patsy (1928)
 The Shannons of Broadway (1929)
 The Divine Lady (1929)
 Lucky Devils (1933)
 Headline Shooter (1933)
 Andy Hardy's Blonde Trouble (1944)
 Mickey (1948)

References

External links

Agnes Christine Johnson  at Women Film Pioneers Project

1896 births
1978 deaths
American women screenwriters
People from Swissvale, Pennsylvania
Women film pioneers
Screenwriters from Pennsylvania
20th-century American women writers
20th-century American screenwriters